In algebraic geometry, the projection formula states the following:

For a morphism  of ringed spaces, an -module  and a locally free -module  of finite rank, the natural maps of sheaves

are isomorphisms.

There is yet another projection formula in the setting of étale cohomology.

See also 
Integration along fibers#Projection formula

References 

Theorems in algebraic geometry